Eupithecia weigti is a moth in the family Geometridae first described by Vladimir G. Mironov and Ulrich Ratzel in 2012. It is found in Syria.

The ground colour of the forewings is ash grey with distinct, narrow, blackish-brown transverse lines. The hindwings are paler, whitish grey.

Etymology
The species is named in honour of German specialist on Eupitheciini Mr. Hans-Joachim Weigt (Schwerte).

References

External links

Moths described in 2012
weigti
Endemic fauna of Syria
Moths of Asia